The following is an independently list of the best-selling albums in Italy. Federazione Industria Musicale Italiana (FIMI) or related publishers does not provide an official list but news and mainstream media usually have provided albums sales claims.

It is estimated that the best-selling album of all time in Italy is La vita è adesso (1985) by Claudio Baglioni which remained for 27 consecutive weeks in first place in Superclassifica TV Sorrisi e Canzoni, from 16 June 1985 to 12 January 1986 (a record that still stands today) and a total of 90 weeks (18 months) in the top ten with more than 3,800,000 copies sold.

The best-selling album in the world by an Italian is Andrea Bocelli's Romanza, with estimated 17 million copies (800,000 in Italy). The best selling foreign album in Italy is estimated to be True Blue by Madonna with 1.5 million copies.

Best-selling albums of all-time in Italy

1 million or more copies

500,000 and less than 1 million copies

See also 
 List of certified albums in Italy (best selling albums in Italy since 2009)
 List of best-selling albums
 Italian estimated best-selling music artists

Notes

References 

Italy
Italian music-related lists